James M. Thomson may refer to:

 James M. Thomson (newspaper publisher) (1878–1959), American newspaper publisher
 James M. Thomson (Virginia politician) (1924–2001), American politician in the Virginia House of Delegates

See also
 James Maurice Thompson (1844–1901), American novelist
 James Matthew Thompson (1878–1956), English historian and theologian